Bebearia absolon, the Absolon forester, is a butterfly in the family Nymphalidae. It is found in Guinea, Sierra Leone, Liberia, Ivory Coast, Ghana, Nigeria, Cameroon, Gabon, the Republic of the Congo, the Central African Republic, the Democratic Republic of the Congo, Uganda and Tanzania. The habitat consists of forests.

The larvae feed on Trachyphrynium and Hypselodelphys species.

Subspecies
Bebearia absolon absolon (eastern Guinea, Sierra Leone, Liberia, Ivory Coast, Ghana, Nigeria, Cameroon, Gabon, Congo, Central African Republic, Democratic Republic of the Congo: Mayumbe, Ubangi, Mongala, Uele, Ituri, northern Kivu, Tshopo, Tshuapa, Equateur, Kinshasa, Kasai, Sankuru and Lualaba)
Bebearia absolon entebbiae (Lathy, 1906) (Uganda, north-western Tanzania)

References

Butterflies described in 1793
absolon
Taxa named by Johan Christian Fabricius